Atrocolus is a genus of beetles in the family Cerambycidae, containing the following species:

 Atrocolus guarani Monne & Monne, 2011
 Atrocolus mariahelenae Monne & Monne, 2008

References

Prioninae